Christos as a surname may refer to:

 Maria Devi Christos (born 1960), Ukrainian religious leader
 Jon Christos (born 1976), English musician

See also
 Christ (surname)

Greek-language surnames